Archbishop Francisco Ramón Herboso y Figueroa (c. 1720–1782) was born in Lima. He was the archbishop of La Plata o Charcas, an area now known as Sucre, Bolivia.  He was appointed to this position in 1776. He died in Charcas Province.

External links and additional sources
 (for Chronology of Bishops)
 (for Chronology of Bishops)

1720 births
1782 deaths
18th-century Roman Catholic archbishops in Bolivia
Clergy from Lima
People from Potosí Department
People from Sucre
Roman Catholic archbishops of Sucre